Röggeliner See is a lake in the Nordwestmecklenburg district in Mecklenburg-Vorpommern, Germany. At an elevation of 37.2 m, its surface area is 1.77 km².

External links 
 
 

Lakes of Mecklenburg-Western Pomerania
LRoggelinerSee